Elysius atrata is a moth of the family Erebidae. It was described by Cajetan Felder, Rudolf Felder and Alois Friedrich Rogenhofer in 1874. It is found in Colombia, Ecuador, Bolivia and Peru.

References

atrata
Moths described in 1874
Moths of South America